The Good Cook was a series of instructional cookbooks published by Time-Life Books 1978-1980 and sold on a month-to-month basis until the early 1990s and edited by cookbook author Richard Olney. Each volume was dedicated to a specific subject (such as fruits or sauces) and was heavily illustrated with photos of cooking techniques. Recipes were drawn from a wide array of published sources, all scrupulously acknowledged.

The 28 volumes were as follows:

Beef and Veal
Beverages
Biscuits/Cookies and Crackers (US title) 
Breads
Cakes and Pastries/Cakes (US)
Confectionery/Candy (US)
Desserts/Classic Desserts (US)
Eggs and Cheese
Fish and Shellfish (two separate volumes, US)
Fruits
Game (UK only) 
Grains, Pasta and Pulses/Dried Beans and Grains (US)
Hot Hors d'Oeuvres/Hors d'Oeuvres
Lamb
Offal/Variety Meats (US)
Outdoor Cooking
Pasta (US only) 
Patisserie/Pies and Pastries (US) 
Pork
Poultry
Preserving
Salads and cold Hors-d'Oeuvre/Salads (US)
Sauces
Snacks and Canapes/Snacks and Sandwiches (US)
Soups
Terrines, Pates and Galantines
Vegetables
Wine

In addition there was a 50-page booklet "The Well-Equipped Kitchen" that came with the set.

See also
Foods of the World - a similar Time-Life cookbook series 
Richard Olney  -  Chief Series Consultant of "The Good Cook" book set

Cookbooks